Iram Khalid is a Pakistani politician who had been a Member of the Provincial Assembly of Sindh, from June 2013 to May 2018.

Education
She earned the degree of Bachelor of Arts from Saint Joseph's College for Women, Karachi.

Political career

She was elected to the Provincial Assembly of Sindh as a candidate of Pakistan Peoples Party on a reserved seat for women in 2013 Pakistani general election.

In July 2016, she was inducted into the provincial Sindh cabinet of Chief Minister Syed Murad Ali Shah and was appointed as special assistant on women development.

References

Living people
Sindh MPAs 2013–2018
Pakistan People's Party politicians
Year of birth missing (living people)